Worship Him is the first full album from the Swiss death/black metal band Samael. Released in 1991, it was the first-ever release from Osmose Productions, an independent French metal label. Worship Him is considered a milestone in the development of second wave black metal.

Background and recording
Released on April 1, 1991, Worship Him was the first full-length album released by the newly formed Osmose Productions. Vorphalack, Samael's guitarist and singer, described the experience of recording the album with Claude Lander:

Musical style and influences
Samael's initial influences were Slayer, Bathory, Venom and early Possessed, plus NWOBHM acts Motörhead and Iron Maiden. Hellhammer were also hugely inspirational. Vorphalack claims that when he heard Apocalyptic Raids he thought:

Legacy
Terrorizer magazine's first "Black Metal Special" issue recognized Samael as one of the early second wave of black metal bands that were "highly respected, influential  and, most importantly, had their own unique sound." Worship Him had a significant impact on the early Norwegian black metal scene. Euronymous of Mayhem was a big supporter of the band. Although he never offered Samael a  deal with Deathlike Silence Productions label, Euronymous regretted not releasing Worship Him, which he deemed an outstanding record. Another key figure in the early Norwegian black metal scene, Fenriz of Darkthrone fame, deemed Worship Him as a classic black metal album. The musician included the song "Into the Pentagram" as part of his own The Best of Old-School Black Metal compilation. Fenriz stated in the CD booklet the said song is "Samael's answer to Hellhammer's 'Triumph of Death'". Of Samael's early sound, he said the following:

Decibel magazine inducted Worship Him to their "Hall of Fame" on their #118 issue.

Track listing

All songs written by Vorphalack, except where noted.

Personnel
Vorphalack : vocals, guitars, bass
Xytraguptor : keyboards, drums, percussion

Production
Arranged and produced by Samael
Recorded at Taurus Studio, Switzerland, March 1990
Recorded and mixed by Claude Lander

References

Bibliography

 Fenriz. (2004). Fenriz presents... The best of old-school black metal. United Kingdom: Peaceville Records.
 Patterson, Dayal. (2013). Black metal: evolution of the cult. Port Townsend: Feral House.
 Strachan, Guy (2005). The boys from the black stuff: a brief history of black metal, part two: in the name of the lore. Terrorizer, 128: 37.

1991 debut albums
Samael (band) albums
Osmose Productions albums